Luka Asatiani (born 22 April 1999) is a Georgian footballer who plays as a centre back for FC Rustavi.

Career statistics

Club

Notes

References

External links
 

1999 births
Living people
Footballers from Georgia (country)
Expatriate footballers from Georgia (country)
Association football defenders
I liga players
Jagiellonia Białystok players
Wigry Suwałki players
Olimpia Zambrów players
FC Metalurgi Rustavi players
Expatriate sportspeople from Georgia (country) in Poland
Expatriate footballers in Poland